Amin Tighazoui (born 20 April 1989) is a French footballer of Moroccan descent currently playing for WAC as a winger.

References

External links
Amin Tighazoui at Elite Football
Amin Tighazoui at Footballdatabase

1989 births
French footballers
Living people
People from Toul
Association football wingers
Sportspeople from Meurthe-et-Moselle
FC Vaduz players
Swiss expatriate footballers
Expatriate footballers in Liechtenstein
FC Winterthur players
Wydad AC players
Olympique Club de Khouribga players
French expatriate footballers
French sportspeople of Moroccan descent
Expatriate footballers in Morocco
French expatriate sportspeople in Morocco
French expatriate sportspeople in Austria
French expatriate sportspeople in Liechtenstein
Footballers from Grand Est